Engina chinoi is a species of sea snail, a marine gastropod mollusc in the family Pisaniidae,.

Description

Distribution
This marine species occurs off the Philippines.

References

 Fraussen K. (2009) Engina chinoi (Gastropoda: Buccinidae), a new species from the Philippines. Visaya 2(5): 85-87

External links

Pisaniidae
Gastropods described in 2009